Child Development is a bimonthly peer-reviewed academic journal covering developmental psychology from the fetal period to adolescence. It was established in 1930 and the editor-in-chief is Glenn Roisman. It is published by Wiley-Blackwell on behalf of the Society for Research in Child Development. The journal publishes original contributions on topics in child development from the fetal period through adolescence.

Abstracting and indexing 
The journal is abstracted and indexed in:

According to the Journal Citation Reports, the journal has a 2018 impact factor of 5.024.

References

External links 
 

Developmental psychology journals
Wiley-Blackwell academic journals
Publications established in 1930
English-language journals
Bimonthly journals
Educational psychology journals